Giovanni Boggian (born 24 July 1996) is an Italian football player. He plays for A.S.D. Imperia.

Club career
He made his Serie C debut for Savona on 10 October 2015 in a game against L'Aquila.

On 15 September 2018, he joined St. Georgen in Serie D. In the following season, he joined A.S.D. Imperia.

References

External links
 

1996 births
Sportspeople from Monza
Living people
Italian footballers
Savona F.B.C. players
U.S. Pistoiese 1921 players
Paganese Calcio 1926 players
Serie C players
Serie D players
Association football forwards
Footballers from Lombardy